The 2009 Shannons V8 Touring Car National Series is the second running of the V8 Touring Car National Series. The series takes place on the program of Shannons Nationals Motor Racing Championships events. The series was won by South Australian driver Adam Wallis.

Calendar
The 2009 Shannons V8 Touring Car National Series will consist of five rounds held across three states:

Teams and drivers
The following teams and drivers have competed during the 2009 Shannons V8 Touring Car National Series.

Driver standings

See also
 2009 V8 Supercar season

External links
 Official series website

References

Shannons V8 Touring Car National Series
V8 Touring Car Series